George Arbuthnot may refer to:

 George Arbuthnot (civil servant) (1802–1865), British civil servant
 George Arbuthnot (politician) (1836–1912), British politician
 George Gough Arbuthnot (1848–1929), businessman and civil leader in British India
 George Bingham Arbuthnot (1803–1867), Major-General in the Honourable East India Company
 George Arbuthnot (priest) (1846–1922), Archdeacon of Coventry

See also
 Charles George Arbuthnot (1824–1899), British Army officer
 Charles George James Arbuthnot (1801–1870), British general
 Arbuthnot (disambiguation)